Nantwich railway station serves the town of Nantwich, Cheshire, England. Opened in 1858, it was the junction for the Great Western Railway route to Wellington via Market Drayton until 1963.

History
The town was initially considered as potential calling point for the Grand Junction Railway route between London, Birmingham and Manchester/Liverpool, but opposition from coaching and canal interests therein led to the Grand Junction being routed through  instead. The Crewe and Shrewsbury Railway would end up being the first route into the town – authorised by Parliament in 1852, it was eventually opened in September 1858 and was operated by the London and North Western Railway. This subsequently became part of a busy through route between the north west of England and South Wales (the modern day Welsh Marches Line).  The Nantwich and Market Drayton Railway linking the titular towns opened five years later, making the station a junction in the process – known locally as the "Gingerbread Line" (Market Drayton being renown for the production of said confectionery), it was later extended to Wellington and officially became part of the Great Western Railway system in 1897.  This line was a busy freight artery but in pre-grouping days was also used by the GWR to run expresses all the way to Manchester London Road (albeit using running rights over the LNWR north of Nantwich).

Passenger services over the Market Drayton line were withdrawn by the British Railways Board on 9 September 1963. Freight continued to run for the next four years (the line was utilised as a diversionary route during the electrification of the West Coast Main Line), but it eventually closed completely in 1967 and was lifted by 1970.

There are three level crossings at or near to the station and until the late 1960s each had its own signal box; a fourth was also provided to the south to control the junction with the Market Drayton branch. All but the station box were removed in the 1970s when the crossings were automated, with the latter also succumbing when the line was re-signalled in late 2013 (the crossings are now remotely monitored from the South Wales rail operating centre in Cardiff). After two years of disuse, the structure was dismantled by Network Rail in January 2016 for reuse at its training academy at Crewe.

Stationmasters

S.S. Durrad 1858
George May 1858 - 1863
G. Clark 1863 - 1864
Isaac Dunton 1864 - 1874
J. Marston 1874 - 1877
John Augustus Vaughan 1877 - 1881
H. Gilrap 1881 - 1885
T. Reid 1885 - 1889
Frank J. Cooke 1889 - 1893
Jesse Wycherley 1893 -1898
William Dale 1898 - 1903
J. Howell 1903 - 1913
Charles Harding 1913 - 1916 (formerly station master at Wrenbury, afterwards station master at Whitchurch)
W.G.H. Haycock 1916 - 1929 (formerly station master at Malpas)
E. Howarth 1930 - 1941
J.B. Grocott 1941 - 1947
J.W. Tate 1947 - 1957 (from 1950 also station master at Willaston)
George Wilkinson 1957 - 1962 (afterwards station master at Newcastle-Under-Lyme)
Samuel Lawton from 1962

Facilities
The station is now unstaffed but has a self-service ticket machine available, which can be used for pre-paid ticket collection and buying before travel.  The main building on the northbound platform still stands, but has been converted for use as an Indian restaurant; shelters are located on each side for passenger use.  Train running information is provided by CIS screens, customer help points and timetable poster boards.  The footbridge linking the platforms has steps, but level access is possible via the crossing and ramps to each platform.

Services

The station is served by two-hourly services between Crewe and Shrewsbury.

There is an infrequent service (five trains northbound, six southbound) which runs on Sundays.

References

Further reading

External links 

Nantwich
Railway stations in Cheshire
DfT Category F1 stations
Former London and North Western Railway stations
Railway stations in Great Britain opened in 1858
Railway stations served by Transport for Wales Rail